Wes Johnson (born June 6, 1961) is an American actor, cartoonist, comedian and voice artist, who has appeared in such films as A Dirty Shame, Head of State, The Invasion, For Richer or Poorer and Hearts in Atlantis. He has appeared on television in Homicide: Life on the Streets, The Wire, and Veep. Wes is married to his childhood sweetheart Kim Barrett Johnson. They are the parents of three sons.

Career
Wes co-presented with the legendary Wolfman Jack for two years on his last nationally syndicated radio show, writing comedy sketches and performing them with the Wolfman live on a weekly basis.  Wes has written for and appeared in various comedy troupes including Fresh Victims, Gross National Product, and The Loyal Opposition. He also created the comic strips Martini 'N Clyde and Joe Fan, which have been published in The Washington Times and Sports Fan Magazine, respectively.

Wes is the P.A. announcer for the National Hockey League's Washington Capitals.

Wes was the series announcer for America's Most Wanted on FOX until December 2009, replacing the late Don LaFontaine in September 2008.

Wes filmed the pilot "Bennie's" with Ed Asner in summer 2016. He portrayed a character named "Walter".

Wes' voice has appeared in cartoons, commercials and video games.

He provided voice acting for three installments of The Elder Scrolls: Morrowind, Oblivion, and Skyrim. He voiced Lucien Lachance, the Gray Fox, the Arena Announcer, Sheogorath, Hermaeus Mora, Emperor Titus Mede II and was the default voice for Imperial males in Oblivion. In 2014, Johnson reprised the role of Sheogorath for the YouTube series Elder Scrolls Lore by the channel ShoddyCast. Later in 2015 he voiced the super mutant King Ludd as well as Scribe Bigsley in ShoddyCast's The storyteller: A Fallout Lore Series.

He also lent his voice to Star Trek: Legacy, which features the voices of all five original TV Captains, and the video game Star Trek: Conquest.

He appeared in Fallout 3 as the nefarious Mister Burke as well as the Super Mutants Fawkes and Uncle Leo, the Protectrons, Sentry Bots, and Scribe Bigsley. In Fallout 4 he reprised the Protectrons, as well as playing The Silver Shroud and Moe Cronin.

He plays Z'aanta in Square Enix's Octopath Traveller.

Wes has appeared on The Shari Elliker Show on WBAL in Baltimore, Maryland, Broadminded on XM 155, and reviewed movies weekly for The Chip Franklin Show on KOGO in San Diego, California.

He appeared as a guest narrator for symphonic black metal band Epicland on the album Bound for Greatness.

He appeared in the short films Oblivion in Real Life and Oblivion in Real Life II on the LaFave Bros YouTube channel. Johnson declined payment for his appearances, instead asking viewers to consider donating to the Alzheimer's Association.

He also has a YouTube channel.

Filmography

Film

Television

Video Games

Short film

References

External links
 Official site
 
 Article in San Francisco Chronicle

1961 births
American male comedians
21st-century American comedians
American male television actors
American male voice actors
Living people
National Hockey League public address announcers
The Washington Times people
America's Most Wanted